Stem Cells is a peer-review scientific journal of cell biology. It was established as The International Journal of Cell Cloning in 1983, acquiring its current title in 1993.

The journal is published by AlphaMed Press, and is currently edited by Jan Nolta (University of California). Stem Cells currently has an impact factor of 6.277.

Abstracting and indexing
The journal is abstracted and indexed in the following bibliographic databases:

References

External links

Wiley (publisher) academic journals
Molecular and cellular biology journals
Publications established in 1983
Monthly journals
English-language journals